Ronald Wayne Morris (born November 4, 1964) is a former professional American football wide receiver in the National Football League. He played six seasons for the Chicago Bears (1987–1992). In 1987, Ron Morris received the Brian Piccolo Award which is awarded to the rookie that best exemplifies the teamwork, loyalty, dedication, sense of humor, and courage of the late Brian Piccolo. In 1995, Morris was awarded $5.2 million for a lawsuit stemming from a knee injury that ended his career.

His younger brother Bam Morris played for the Pittsburgh Steelers, Chicago Bears, Baltimore Ravens, and the Kansas City Chiefs.

References

1964 births
Living people
African-American players of American football
People from Cooper, Texas
Players of American football from Texas
American football wide receivers
SMU Mustangs football players
Chicago Bears players
21st-century African-American people
20th-century African-American sportspeople
Ed Block Courage Award recipients
Brian Piccolo Award winners